Henri Schouteden (9 July 1881, Brussels – 15 November 1972, Brussels) was a Belgian zoologist, ornithologist and entomologist who undertook numerous expeditions into the Congo, Rwanda, and Burundi.

Works
(All in French)
Schouteden, H. (1912). "Rhopaloceres recuillis dans l’Uelle par M.Castelain". Annales de la Société Entomologique de Belgique. 55: 362–364.
Schouteden, H. (1912). "Rhopaloceres recuillis dans le Haut-Ituri par le Dr Bayer". Revue de Zoologie Africaine. 1: 389–396.
Schouteden, H. (1919). "La faune des Acraides du Congo Belge". Revue de Zoologie Africaine. 6: 145–162.
Schouteden, H. (1926). "Contribution a l’etude des Lepidopteres Rhopaloceres du Katanga (collections Overlaet, etc.)". Revue de Zoologie Africaine. 14: 217–236.
Schouteden, H. (1927). "Contribution a l’etude des Lepidopteres Rhopaloceres du Katanga (collections Overlaet, etc.). 2me partie. Nymphalidae et Acraeidae". Revue de Zoologie Africaine. 14: 283–309.
Schouteden, H. (1934). "Charaxes Overlaeti nov. sp". Revue de Zoologie et de Botanique Africaine. 26: 122–124.

Species named in honor of Schouteden
Species named for Schouteden include a worm lizard Monopeltis schoutedeni, a chameleon Trioceros schoutedeni, a snake Helophis schoutedeni, a shrew Paracrocidura schoutedeni, a butterfly Bebearia schoutedeni, a testate amoeba Hyalosphenia schoutedeni, a pufferfish Tetraodon schoutedeni, among many others. His collection of butterflies from the Belgian Congo is held by the Royal Museum for Central Africa.

Sources
Osborn, H. (1952). A Brief History of Entomology Including Time of Demosthenes and Aristotle to Modern Times with over Five Hundred Portraits. Columbus, Ohio: The Spahr & Glenn Company. 303 pp.

References

Further reading
de Witte G.-F. (1934). "Batraciens récoltés au Congo Belge par le Dr. H. Schouteden et par M. G.-F. de Witte". Annales du Musée Royal du Congo Belge, Sciences Zoologiques, Tervuren. 3: 159–187.

External links

 Archive Henri Schouteden, Royal Museum for Central Africa

Belgian entomologists
20th-century Belgian zoologists
Belgian ornithologists
Belgian lepidopterists
1972 deaths
1881 births